Shelter is the first novel of the "Mickey Bolitar" young adult series by American crime writer Harlan Coben. It features the teenage nephew of Coben's popular protagonist Myron Bolitar. The novel was first published on September 15, 2011, by Orion Books in the UK and Puffin Books in the US.

Reception
Geoff Adams, for the Otago Daily Times, found that the novel provided "mystery, suspense and thrills enough" and concluded that "you will enjoy reading it to find out more. And it is not too grisly." The Irish Independent stated that, while it is a series aimed at teenagers, "older folk will love this cracking new series, too." Kirkus Reviews stated that the novel "benefits greatly from [Coben's] trademark crackerjack pace and multi-layered plotting." They found that the short attention span of the protagonist was "both age appropriate and believable" and that Mickey Bolitar's "mother's struggle with drug addiction adds poignancy" to the novel. In conclusion, they found it to be "a not-bad-at-all entry into the teen market for this adult author."

Plot summary 
Mickey Bolitar, 15, tries to figure out why his new girlfriend, Ashley Kent, stopped coming to school and has seemingly vanished. Getting no assistance from teachers or administrators, Mickey turns to a couple of fellow students for help. All the while, Mickey deals with having to live under the same roof as his estranged uncle, Myron, while his mother is checked into rehab for a drug addiction. Also, a strange neighbor woman who lives in an eerie mansion tells Mickey that his father is alive, even though Mickey saw him die in a car accident more than a year ago.

Main characters
Mickey Bolitar: a high school student and talented basketball player, son of Brad and Kitty Bolitar, and nephew of Myron Bolitar.
Myron Bolitar: a sports agent and Mickey's estranged uncle.
Ema: An goth with a sarcastic wit, whom Mickey rescues from humiliation in gym class.
Spoon: A socially awkward nerd à la Steve Urkel who uses his hacking skills to assist Mickey in saving his father's life.
Bat Lady: A strange woman who tells Mickey that his father is alive.
Kitty Hammer Bolitar: Mickey's drug-addicted mother who has checked into a rehab facility.

Television adaptation
In April 2021, it was announced that Amazon Studios had ordered a pilot for a possible series based on the novel. Ed Decter will act as showrunner and executive producer. In March 2022, it was announced that Amazon had given the production a series order. The cast will include Jaden Michael as Mickey, Constance Zimmer as Mickey's aunt Shira, Adrian Greensmith as Spoon, Abby Corrigan as Ema, and Sage Linder as Rachel Caldwell.

References

Novels by Harlan Coben
2011 American novels
Orion Books books
G. P. Putnam's Sons books
American crime novels
American thriller novels